Piwniczka is a cave in Miętusie Turnie in the Miętusia Valley in the Western Tatras. It is located within Tatra National Park in Poland. The entrance to it is located on the north-west slope of Mała Świstówka, above the Miętusia Wyżnia Cave, at an altitude of 1,440 meters above sea level. The length of the cave is 9 meters and its height is 7 meters.

Description of the cave 
The main part of the cave is a 6-meter well accessed by a 2-meter, almost horizontal corridor that starts with a small entrance opening. A vertical clamp on the right leads into a 6-meter well that widens at the bottom. There is then a small room with rubble at the bottom.

There are no speleothems in the cave. Near the opening, mosses and lichens grow on the damp walls..

Discovery 
The cave was discovered by members of the PTTK Warsaw Speleoklub [Spelunking Club] in 1987.

References 

Caves of Poland